Hans Brandtun (born 16 August 1963) is a Norwegian footballer. He played in one match for the Norway national football team in 1985.

References

External links
 

1963 births
Living people
Norwegian footballers
Norway international footballers
Footballers from Bergen
Association football defenders
SK Brann players
Rosenborg BK players
Fyllingen Fotball players